Pakistan has one of the largest man-made canal systems in the world providing irrigation facilities to 48 million acres.  Canal network of Pakistan consists of Main Canals, Branch Canals, Link Canals, Major distributaries, Minor distributaries, and Watercourses or Field Channels.

Main Canal:  A principal channel off-taking directly from a river or reservoir which has discharge capacity of above 25 cubic meter/sec (cumecs) is called Main Canal or Main Line. These Canals are not used for direct irrigation. They drive water from the river/ reservoir through head regulator and feed it to Branch Canals and Major distributaries.

Branch Canal: They take-off water from Main Canal and feed the Major and Minor distributaries. They are also not used for direct irrigation. Their discharge capacity usually ranges from 5-25 cubic meter/second.

Link Canal: These Canals are meant to Transfer Water of three Western Rivers, namely Chenab, Jhelum and Indus to the canals dependent on the three Eastern Rivers, namely Sutlej, Beas and Ravi.

Some of the notable canals of Pakistan are listed here.

Canals in Punjab

Canals in Sindh

Canals in Khyber Pakhtunkhwa

See also 
 Punjab Canal Colonies
 Punjab Irrigation Department
 List of barrages and headworks in Pakistan
 List of rivers of Pakistan
 List of canals

References

External links

Irrigation Department Government of Punjab
 Irrigation Department Government of KP
Irrigation Department Government of Sindh

 
Pakistan
Bodies of water of Pakistan
Irrigation in Pakistan
Agriculture in Punjab, Pakistan